Baldoc may refer to:

 Baldoc, Pandan, a barangay of Pandan, Catanduanes
 Cosmin Baldoc, a contestant in the 2007 FINA Men's Water Polo World League
 Neil Baldoc, an engineer on Reasons for Voyaging
 Ralph de Baldoc, a mediaeval Bishop of London

See also
 Baldock